Data de Groove is the sixth album by Austrian singer Falco, released in May 1990 – a collaboration with producer Robert Ponger. It was dedicated to the upcoming computer era and peaked at number 11 in Austria. It is known to be his most complex and intellectual album. So far it is the only album out of print and therefore quite a rarity, especially on CD format. However, in February 2016 the album became available for download in digital form on iTunes, as well as a stream on Spotify. In 2022, the album resurfaced when a Deluxe Edition was released, with all songs remastered and featured remixes and edits of several tracks.

Two singles were released: "Data de Groove" and "Charisma Kommando".

Track listing 
 Neo Nothing – Post of All – 4:45
 Expocityvisions – 4:08
 Charisma Kommando – 4:49
 Tanja P. nicht Cindy C. - 3:37
 Pusher – 4:26
 Data de Groove – 4:40
 Alles im Liegen – 5:05
 U.4.2.P.1. Club Dub – 3:41
 Bar Minor 7/11 (Jeanny Dry) – 3:45
 Anaconda 'mour – 0:57

Bonus tracks on 2022 re-release 
 Data De Groove (Club Mix)6:48
 Data De Groove (Digital-Analogue Version)4:00
 Data De Groove (Human Version)3:59
 Data De Groove (Instrumental Version)4:57
 Data De Groove (Full Length Version)4:57
 Charisma Kommando (Club Mix)7:34
 Charisma Kommando (Radio Version)4:02
 Charisma Kommando (Instrumental Club Mix)7:34
 Charisma Kommando (Instrumental Radio Version)4:02
 Charisma Kommando (Full Length Version)5:39
 Neo Nothing - Post Of All (Full Length Version)5:31
 Tanja P. Nicht Cindy C. (Full Length Version)4:26

Personnel 
 Falco – bass, producer
 Robert Ponger – digital & analog keyterminals, mixer, producer
 Peter Ponger – additional keyboards
 Jens Fischer, Peter Weihe – guitars
 Curt Cress – drums
 Andy Baum, Bernhard Rabitsch, Jocelyn B. Smith, Victoria Miles – background vocals
 Stefan Biedermann – scratches
 Wolfgang Puschnig – saxophones

 Christian Seitz – engineer, mixer @ Stereo West Studio, Vienna
 Steve Taylor – mixer @ Livingston Studios, London
 John Mallison – mixing assistant engineer
 Ralph Lindner – mastering (digital) @ Ham Audio
 Achim Kruse, Ralph Lindner – mastering (analog) @ Chateau du Pape, Hamburg
 Lo Breier – cover design
 Juergen Teller – photography

Charts

References 

1990 albums
Falco (musician) albums
German-language albums